Igor Valentinovitch Tkachenko (July 26, 1964 — August 16, 2009) was a Russian military pilot with the rank of Colonel, Russian Knights group leader, Chief of the 237th Guards Aviation Showing Center of the Russian Air Force at Kubinka air base. He was killed in a mid-air collision whilst practicing for the 2009 MAKS Airshow.

He was awarded the Hero of the Russian Federation honorary title posthumously on August 22, 2009, and the main-belt asteroid 269390 Igortkachenko, discovered by Russian amateur astronomer Leonid Elenin in 2009, was named in his memory. Naming citation was published on 19 September 2013.

Commands 
 Commander of the 237-th Aviation Technology Demonstration Center of the Russian Federation's AF
 Commander of the Russian Knights

References 

1964 births
2009 deaths
Aviators killed in aviation accidents or incidents
Heroes of the Russian Federation
Russian Air Force officers
Victims of aviation accidents or incidents in Russia
Victims of aviation accidents or incidents in 2009